The 1904–05 collegiate men's basketball season in the United States began in December 1904, progressed through the regular season, and concluded in March 1905.

Season headlines 

 In February 1943, the Helms Athletic Foundation retroactively selected Columbia as its national champion for the 1904–05 season.
 In 1995, the Premo-Porretta Power Poll retroactively selected Columbia as its national champion for the 1904–05 season.

Conference membership changes

Regular season

Conference winners 

NOTE: The Western Conference (the future Big Ten Conference) did not sponsor an official conference season or recognize a regular-season champion until the 1905–06 season. In 1904–05, Chicago (9–3) finished with the best winning percentage (.750) and Wisconsin (10–8) with the most wins.

Statistical leaders

Awards

Helms College Basketball All-Americans 

The practice of selecting a Consensus All-American Team did not begin until the 1928–29 season. The Helms Athletic Foundation later retroactively selected a list of All-Americans for the 1904–05 season.

Major player of the year awards 

 Helms Player of the Year: Christian Steinmetz, Wisconsin (retroactive selection in 1944)

Coaching changes

References